Miss Brazil 2009 was the 55th edition of the Miss Brazil pageant. It was held on 9 May 2009 at the Latin American Memorial Complex in São Paulo, São Paulo State, Brazil and was hosted by Nayla Micherif and Renata Fan. Natálya Anderle of Rio Grande do Sul crowned her successor Larissa Costa of Rio Grande do Norte at the end of the event. Costa represented Brazil at the Miss Universe 2009 pageant. 1st Runner-Up, Rayanne Morais of Minas Gerais represented the country at Miss International 2009.

Results

Special Awards

Contestants
The delegates for Miss Brazil 2009 were:

 - Elkar Portela de Almeida
 - Kamyla Brandão Loureiro Moura
 - Enyellen Campos Salles
 - Cecília Maria Alves Stadler
 - Paloma Garzedim Vega
 - Khrisley Karlen Gonçalves da Silva
 - Denise Ribeiro Aliceral
 - Bianca Lopes Gava
 - Anielly Campos Barros
 - Thaís dos Santos Portela
 - Mônica Huppes
 - Pilar Velásquez
 - Rayanne Fernanda de Morais
 - Rayana de Carvalho Brêda
 - Flora Alexandre Meira
 - Karine Martins de Souza
 - Isabela dos Santos Nascimento
 - Francisca Vanessa Barros da Costa
 - Fernanda Gomes
 - Larissa Costa Silva de Oliveira
 - Bruna Gabriele Felisberto
 - Lorena Garcia Mendonça
 - Ana Luiza de Oliveira Pinto
 - Francine Arruda
 - Sílvia Novais Silva
 - Luna Clayane Meneses da Silva
 - Natália Araújo Bichuete

Notes

Replacements
 - Louisse Freire was replaced by Thaís Portela.
 - Priscila Nascimento was replaced by Natália Bichuete.

References

External links 
Official Miss Brasil Website

2009
2009 in Brazil
2009 beauty pageants